Kuilua is a genus of beetles in the family Megalopodidae, containing the following species:

 Kuilua africana Jacoby, 1894
 Kuilua apicicornis Pic, 1930
 Kuilua brevior Pic, 1917
 Kuilua ertli Weise, 1919
 Kuilua loveni Weise, 1926
 Kuilua reducta Pic, 1949

References

Megalopodidae genera
Taxa named by Martin Jacoby